Nasrullah Rahu is a village in Taluka Moro Naushahro Feroze District in the province of  Sindh,  Pakistan Ali Asghar Rahu Printers Jail Road Moro 03323919037, 03033067143 .

References